Giorgio Raguseo (1580 – 1622) was an Italian philosopher, theologist, and orator from the Republic of Venice.

Born an illegitimate child in Dubrovnik (formerly Ragusa), Croatia, Raguseo had to beg before being taken to Venice by a gentleman who provided him an education.  He became a priest and taught at the University of Padua.

Works

References

See also 

 Aristotelianism
 Cesare Cremonini
 Italian philosophy
 Renaissance philosophy

1622 deaths
1580 births
Italian philosophers